Kronichthys is a genus of armored catfishes endemic to Brazil.

The genus is named in honor of naturalist-archaeologist Ricardo Krone (1861-1917), who collected the type species specimen.

Species
There are currently three recognized species in this genus:
 Kronichthys heylandi (Boulenger, 1900)
 Kronichthys lacerta (Nichols, 1919)
 Kronichthys subteres A. Miranda-Ribeiro, 1908

Description 
Kronichthys species are small, cylindrical fishes similar to the hypoptopomatine Schizolecis. The color pattern is dark brown with a slight mottling or four dorsal saddles, and the abdomen mostly white. The dorsal fin is short and the adipose fin is small.

References

Loricariidae
Fish of South America
Endemic fauna of Brazil
Catfish genera
Taxa named by Alípio de Miranda-Ribeiro
Freshwater fish genera